The Silent Witness is a 1917 American silent independent drama film directed by Harry Lambart and starring Gertrude McCoy, Frank O'Connor and Jack Sherrill. It was based on the 1916 Broadway play The Silent Witness by Otto Hauerbach.

Cast
 Gertrude McCoy as Helen Hastings
 Frank O'Connor as Richard Morgan
 Edwin Forsberg as John Pellman 
 Junius Matthews as Bud Morgan 
 Alphie James as Sarah Blakely 
 Helen May as Janet Rigsby
 Roulef E. Cotton as Wilbur Weldon
 Jack Sherrill as Travers
 A.J. Herbert as Norman Blakely 
 Fred Graham as Rigsby
 Albert Phillips as Mr. Weldon

References

Bibliography
 Curtis Marez. University Babylon: Film and Race Politics on Campus. Univ of California Press, 2019.

External links
 

1917 films
1917 drama films
1910s English-language films
American silent feature films
Silent American drama films
American black-and-white films
1910s American films